This is a list of the top-selling singles in New Zealand for 2022 from the Official New Zealand Music Chart's end-of-year chart, compiled by Recorded Music NZ. Recorded Music NZ also published 2022 lists for two sub-charts, the top 20 singles released by New Zealand artists, and the top 20 singles primarily performed in te reo Māori.

Chart 
Key
 – Song of New Zealand origin

Top 20 singles of 2022 by New Zealand artists

Top 20 singles of 2022 sung in te reo Māori

Notes

References 

2022 in New Zealand music
2022 record charts
Singles 2022